This is a list of researchers who have been designated as "Distinguished Scholars" by the National Institutes of Health.

2021 

Keenan A. Walker

2018 

Eric Calvo

Jennifer Clare Jones

H. Nida Sen

References 

National Institutes of Health